is the name of a mausoleum in Higashiyama-ku, Kyoto used by successive generations of the Japanese Imperial Family.

Notable interments

Kamakura period
 86 Emperor Go-Horikawa
 87 Emperor Shijō

Edo period

The Imperial Household Agency maintains Tsuki no wa no misasagi as the place of enshrinement and the venue for veneration of several Edo period emperors.
108 Emperor Go-Mizunoo
109 Empress Meishō
110 Emperor Go-Kōmyō
111 Emperor Go-Sai
112 Emperor Reigen and Takatsukasa Fusako
113 Emperor Higashiyama
114 Emperor Nakamikado
115 Emperor Sakuramachi
116 Emperor Momozono
117 Empress Go-Sakuramachi
118 Emperor Go-Momozono

In addition, this is the official misasagi for Prince Masahito, posthumously named Yōkwōin daijō-tennō, who was the eldest son of Emperor Ōgimachi and the father of Emperor Go-Yōzei.

The final resting places of two Empress Dowagers are also found in this Imperial tomb complex.
119 Emperor Kōkaku and Empress Yoshiko
120 Emperor Ninkō
121 Emperor Kōmei and Empress Eishō

See also
 Emperor of Japan
 List of Emperors of Japan

Notes

References

External links
 Official website of Sennyū-ji

Japanese monarchy
Mausoleums in Japan
Buildings and structures in Kyoto